Stanley Walsh (1938–17 September 2008) was an English-Australian producer, writer and actor best known for his work as producer on television. He started his career in England as an actor and moved to Australia in 1964.

For a number of years he was executive producer on Neighbours.

Credits
Skin Deep (1983) - producer
Kings (1983) - producer
Butterfly Island (1985) - producer
Body Business (1986) - producer
The Golden Fiddles (1991) - producer
The Other Side of Paradise (1992)  -producer
Neighbours (1994-2003) - executive producer
Little Oberon (2005) - executive producer

References

External links

Stanley Walsh at Screen Australia
Stanley Walsh melodramas

Australian television producers
1938 births
2008 deaths